Degenhardt is a German surname. Notable people with the surname include:

Franz Josef Degenhardt (1931–2011), German poet, writer, musician and politician
Hugo Degenhardt, English drummer
Jan Degenhardt (born 1962), German singer
Johannes Joachim Degenhardt (1926–2002), German Roman Catholic archbishop and cardinal
Wolfgang Degenhardt (1924–1993), Australian artist

Fictional characters:
Adrian Degenhardt, a character in the soap opera Verbotene Liebe

See also
Mount Degenhardt, a mountain in Whatcom County, Washington, United States

German-language surnames
Surnames from given names